Kutch Desert Wildlife Sanctuary is situated in the Great Rann of Kutch, Kutch district, Gujarat, India. It was declared a sanctuary in February 1986. It is the largest Wildlife Sanctuary in India areawise.

It is one of the largest seasonal saline wetlands having an average water depth between 0.5 and 1.5 metres. By October–November each year, rain water dries up and the entire area turns into saline desert. The sanctuary supports wide variety of water birds and mammalian wildlife.

Flamingo City
It encompasses a true saline desert where thousands of greater flamingo (Phoenicopterus roseus) nest in the world-famous ‘Flamingo City’ located in the mud flats of the Rann, about 10 km from Nir outpost on Kala Dungar hill. It is the only area where flamingoes congregate to breed regularly.

As per a television series, National Security by Rajya Sabha TV, the flamingo city is now a dead patch of land and flamingos do not come to breed here

Indo-Pak International border
The northern boundary of this sanctuary forms the international border between India and Pakistan and is heavily patrolled by the Border Security Force in India with much of this sanctuary being closed to civilians after the India Bridge at Kala dungar (Black hill), Khavda. Tourists and researchers can only enter here with special permission from the BSF.

Snow white Rann
In the area controlled and patrolled by the Border Security Force (BSF) after the "India Bridge" several hundred square kilometers of Rann is pure white like snow with heavy deposit of salt crystals. The marshy Rann here becomes pure white and flat till the eye can see, till the horizon after the rain water has dried up, in the winters every year.

Excavated city of Dholavira from the Harappan civilization
Buried nearby to where the flamingoes breed is the ancient excavated city of Dholavira from the Harappan civilization, attracting archeologists from all over the world.

Ancient fossil beds
This sanctuary has some other ancient attractions as well. Embedded in the Jurassic and Cretaceous rocks on Khadir, Kuvar and Pachchham bet islands in the Greater Rann, are plenty of fossils of vertebrates, invertebrates and plants. Fossils of dinosaurs, crocodiles (of the 'Dinosaurian period') and whales (dating from the Tertiary period) have been recorded to have been recovered from here. Fossilized trees and forests are found here in the rocks belonging to the Jurassic and Cretaceous periods. The fossils of invertebrates here include those of sea urchins, ammonites and such others.

In popular culture
J. P. Dutta's Bollywood film Refugee is shot on location in the Great Rann of Kutch and other locations in the Kutch district of Gujarat, India. This film is inspired by the famous story by Keki N. Daruwalla based around the Great Rann of Kutch titled "LOVE ACROSS THE SALT DESERT" which is also included as one of the short stories in the School Standard XII syllabus English text book of NCERT in India.

Wildlife Sanctuaries and Reserves of Kutch
From the city of Bhuj various ecologically rich and wildlife conservation areas of the Kutch / Kachchh district can be visited such as Indian Wild Ass Sanctuary, Kutch Desert Wildlife Sanctuary, Narayan Sarovar Sanctuary, Kutch Bustard Sanctuary, Banni Grasslands Reserve and Chari-Dhand Wetland Conservation Reserve etc. On the opposite side of the border in Pakistan, the Rann of Kutch Wildlife Sanctuary preserves 566,375 hectares.

See also
 Arid Forest Research Institute
 Greater Rann of Kutch
 Little Rann of Kutch
 Kutch Bustard Sanctuary
 Narayan Sarovar Sanctuary
 Banni grasslands
 Indian Wild Ass Sanctuary
 List of national parks and wildlife sanctuaries of Gujarat, India

References

  This text was originally published in the book Terrestrial ecoregions of the Indo-Pacific: a conservation assessment from Island Press. Also see: 
 Kutch Desert Wild Life Sanctuary & ; Official websites: Forests & Environment Department; State Government of Gujarat, India
 ASI to take up excavation in Kutch's Khirasara; by Prashant Rupera, TNN; 2 November 2009; Times of India
 Flight scan on nomad bird; by G.S. MUDUR; November 1, 2009; The Telegraph, Calcutta, India
 Pushed to the edge, they thrive in no man's land; TNN; 5 August 2009; Times of India
 ASI’s effort to put Dholavira on World Heritage map hits roadblock; by hitarthpandya; Feb 13, 2009; Indian Express Newspaper
 Jurassic Park: Forest officials stumble upon priceless discovery near Dholavira (2 Page article online); Express news service; Jan 08, 2007; Indian Express Newspaper. Also see , 
 Black Hills, Dark Shadow; by JANYALA SREENIVAS; Apr 03, 2005; Indian Express Newspaper
 Fighting for the Great Rann - It's a desolate, barren tract of land, but the armed forces guard it with a fierceness that inspires nothing short of awe. By Gaurav Raghuvanshi; Feb 25, 2005; Business Line; Financial Daily from THE HINDU group of publications
 Expedition to rescue flamingo chicks launched; TNN; 7 May 2004; Times of India
 Flamingos perish in Rann of Kutch; TNN; 4 May 2004; Times of India
 Footloose in a Forgotten Land; Feb 08, 2004; Extracted with permission from Rupa & Co.; Indian Express Newspaper
 Salt may have choked flamingo chicks; TNN; 30 December 2003; Times of India
 Flamingos stump experts; EXPRESS NEWS SERVICE; April 28, 1999; Indian Express Newspaper
 Young Flamingo birds face hunger & death; April 21, 1999; Indian Express Newspaper
 Death looms large over Flamingo City of Kutch; by EXPRESS NEWS SERVICE; April 20, 1999; Indian Express Newspaper

Wildlife sanctuaries in Gujarat
Grasslands of India
Wetlands of India
1986 establishments in Gujarat
Protected areas of Kutch district
Protected areas established in 1986